Bahamasair serves the following destinations (as of January 2023):

Current destinations

References

Lists of airline destinations